David C. Williams served in the California legislature and during World War I he served in the United States Army.

References

United States Army personnel of World War I
Members of the California State Legislature